The Golden Triangle of NSW is an informal locality situated in northwestern New South Wales, Australia. With a reputation for being prime agricultural land, particularly for cereal crops such as wheat and barley, where the term "Golden" is derived. 
The agricultural community generally regards this region as being East of the Newell Highway and taking area between the villages of North Star, Croppa Creek and Crooble. Other descriptions widen the area to between the better known towns of Boggabilla, Warialda and Moree, New South Wales. 
Less creditable is the description of being the region bounded by the towns of Narrabri, Moree, and Inverell as this area has significant climatic shifts west of the Newell highway, also changes in the geographic features from plains to tablelands and the soil characteristics mean widening the area moves the enterprise mix from substantially cropping to livestock.

Geography of New South Wales